Ivan William Fuqua (August 9, 1909 – January 14, 1994) was an American athlete, a gold medal winner in the 4 × 400 m relay at the 1932 Summer Olympics in Los Angeles.  Fuqua was born in Decatur, Illinois, and graduated from Brazil High School in Brazil, Indiana, where he set multiple track and field school records.  He then went on to play football and excel in track and field at Indiana University, Bloomington, Indiana.

Biography
Fuqua was an AAU champion in 400 m in 1933 and 1934. At the Los Angeles Olympics, or Games of the X Olympiad, Fuqua ran the opening leg in the American 4 × 400 m relay team, winning the gold medal - Indiana University's first - with a new world record of 3:08.2.

After graduation, Ivan Fuqua was appointed track coach at Connecticut State (now the University of Connecticut). He entered the Navy during World War II, and was discharged in 1946 with the rank of lieutenant commander. He joined Brown University as a coach. He stayed there as head coach from 1947 until 1973, when he retired. He later became a manager and co-owner of Galilee Beach Club in Rhode Island.

In 1968, he was inducted into the Rhode Island Heritage Hall of Fame. In 1981, Fuqua was inducted into the Brown University Hall of Fame.

Ivan Fuqua died in Providence, Rhode Island at the age of 84.

Notes and references

1909 births
1994 deaths
American male sprinters
Athletes (track and field) at the 1932 Summer Olympics
Olympic gold medalists for the United States in track and field
Sportspeople from Decatur, Illinois
People from Brazil, Indiana
Sportspeople from Providence, Rhode Island
Medalists at the 1932 Summer Olympics
United States Navy personnel of World War II
United States Navy officers
Military personnel from Illinois